André Filipe Brás André (born 26 August 1989) is a Portuguese professional footballer who plays for Vitória S.C. as a midfielder.

After starting his career at Varzim, he made over 200 Primeira Liga appearances for Vitória de Guimarães and Porto, winning a league title with the latter in 2018.

Club career

Varzim
Born in Vila do Conde, André was brought up at FC Porto and Varzim SC. He made his senior debut with the latter in 2008, going on to total six goals in 49 second division games over two seasons.

In the first half of the 2010–11 campaign, André joined Deportivo de La Coruña B in Spain on a 2+2 contract, suffering relegation from the third tier (only three appearances), a fate which also befell his previous team. He returned to Varzim in January 2011.

André netted 12 times from his midfield position in 2011–12, to help Varzim return to division two after just one year. No promotion eventually befell, however, due to irregularities.

Vitória Guimarães
In summer 2012, André signed with Vitória S.C. of the Primeira Liga. In his first year, he contributed five scoreless appearances in the Taça de Portugal as the club won the competition for the first time in its history. On 27 April 2014, he was one of four first-teamers parachuted into the B team for a crucial 2–1 home win over promotion rivals F.C. Vizela.

André scored 11 goals in the 2014–15 season – eight from penalties– as the Minho Province side finished fifth and qualified to the UEFA Europa League. Highlights included a hat-trick in a 4–0 home win against C.D. Nacional, on 4 January 2015.

Porto
André returned to Porto in June 2015 after eight years, agreeing to a four or five-year deal. In late September, in two home games separated by nine days, he scored his first competitive goals with the club, helping to victories over S.L. Benfica (1–0) and Chelsea (2–1), the latter in the group stage of the UEFA Champions League.

In the 2017–18 campaign, André played 13 matches to help his team win the national championship after a five-year wait.

Return to Vitória
André returned to Guimarães on 4 July 2018. On his debut on 10 August, he scored in a 3–2 loss at Benfica, and fifteen days later on his return to the Estádio do Dragão, he netted a penalty as his team overturned a half-time deficit to beat Porto 3–2.

On 21 March 2021, André extended his contract at the Estádio D. Afonso Henriques up to June 2024. The following January, however, he was loaned to Saudi Professional League club Al-Ittihad Club (Jeddah) with a €1 million buying option.

International career
André represented Portugal at under-19 level. He made his debut with the full side on 31 March 2015, coming on as a 66th-minute substitute for Adrien Silva in a 0–2 friendly defeat against Cape Verde in Estoril.

André scored his first goal on 17 November 2015, finishing Vieirinha's cross to open a 2–0 win over Luxembourg at the Stade Josy Barthel.

Personal life
André's father, António, was also a footballer and a midfielder. He represented Porto for more than one decade, and appeared with Portugal at the 1986 FIFA World Cup.

Career statistics

Club

International

International goals

Honours
Varzim
Segunda Divisão: 2011–12

Vitória Guimarães
Taça de Portugal: 2012–13

Porto
Primeira Liga: 2017–18

References

External links

1989 births
Living people
People from Vila do Conde
Sportspeople from Porto District
Portuguese footballers
Association football midfielders
Primeira Liga players
Liga Portugal 2 players
Segunda Divisão players
Varzim S.C. players
Vitória S.C. players
Vitória S.C. B players
FC Porto players
Segunda División B players
Deportivo Fabril players
Saudi Professional League players
Ittihad FC players
Portugal youth international footballers
Portugal international footballers
Portuguese expatriate footballers
Expatriate footballers in Spain
Expatriate footballers in Saudi Arabia
Portuguese expatriate sportspeople in Spain
Portuguese expatriate sportspeople in Saudi Arabia